Madelaine West Duchovny (born April 24, 1999), known professionally as West Duchovny, is an American actress. She is best known for A Mouthful of Air, The Magicians and Painkiller.

Personal life 
She is the daughter of David Duchovny and Téa Leoni and has a brother named Kyd Miller.

Filmography

Film

Television

References

External links 

1999 births
21st-century American actresses
Actresses from California
American film actresses
American television actresses
Living people
People from Los Angeles